Megu is a Japanese feminine given name. Notable people with the name include:
, a Japanese voice actress
, a Japanese hostess and model
, a Japanese softball player
, Japanese singer
, Japanese individual and synchronized trampoline gymnast

Fictional characters
Megu (Is the Order a Rabbit?), a character in the manga series Is the Order a Rabbit?
Megu Kakizaki, a fictional character appearing in Rozen Maiden
Megu Kanzaki, a fictional and the main character for Majokko Megu-chan

Japanese feminine given names